Lewinella antarctica  is a Gram-negative, obligately aerobic and chemoheterotrophic bacterium from the genus of Lewinella which has been isolated from coastal seawater from the Antarctic.

References

External links
Type strain of Lewinella antarctica at BacDive -  the Bacterial Diversity Metadatabase

Bacteroidota
Bacteria described in 2009